Federal University of Toulouse Midi-Pyrénées (UFTMP) is the association of universities and higher education institutions (ComUE) for institutions of higher education and research in the French region of Midi-Pyrénées.

The university system was created as a ComUE according to the 2013 Law on Higher Education and Research (France), effective July 1, 2015. It replaced the pôle de recherche et d'enseignement supérieur (PRES) which had been organized in 2007 to coordinate higher education and research in the region.

Members 

Université fédérale de Toulouse Midi-Pyrénées brings together the following institutions:

 University Toulouse 1 - Capitole
 University Toulouse 2 - Jean Jaurès
 University Toulouse III - Paul Sabatier
 National Polytechnic Institute of Toulouse (Toulouse INP), consists of 7 schools
 Institut national des sciences appliquées de Toulouse (INSA Toulouse)
 Institut supérieur de l'aéronautique et de l'espace (ISAE-SUPAERO)
 Institut d'études politiques de Toulouse (Sciences Po Toulouse)
 National University Institute Jean-Francois Champollion (INUC)
 École des Mines d'Albi-Carmaux (IMT Mines Albi)
 École nationale de l'aviation civile (ENAC)
 École nationale supérieure d'architecture de Toulouse (ENSA Toulouse)
 École nationale supérieure de formation de l’enseignement agricole (ENSFEA)
 Toulouse Business School (TBS)
 Institut Catholique d'Arts et Métiers (ICAM)

References

External links 
 Université fédérale de Toulouse Midi-Pyrénées website

Toulouse
Federale
Federale
2007 establishments in France
Educational institutions established in 2007
Universities and colleges formed by merger in France